Kaeng Krachan may refer to the following places in Phetchaburi Province, Thailand:

 Kaeng Krachan District
 Kaeng Krachan Dam
 Kaeng Krachan National Park
 Kaeng Krachan Forest Complex, a World Heritage Site covering Kaeng Krachan National Park and some others
 Kaeng Krachan Circuit, a motorsports venue (race track)